General elections were held in Sweden on 15 September 2002, alongside municipal and county council elections. The Swedish Social Democratic Party remained the largest party in the Riksdag, winning 144 of the 349 seats.

After securing a confidence and supply agreement with the Left Party and the Green Party, Prime Minister Göran Persson was able to remain in his position in a third consecutive term as a minority government.

Although the bloc compositions were similar to 1998, the complexions of the centre-right bloc shifted radically. Under new party leader Bo Lundgren, the Moderates lost more than seven percentage points and barely held on as the largest party in its coalition. Only eight municipalities in all of Sweden had the Moderates as the largest party, six of which were in the Stockholm area. The Peoples' Party led by Lars Leijonborg, instead more than doubled its parliamentary delegation and received above 13% of the vote. Lundgren resigned in the wake of the election, leading to the selection of future Prime Minister Fredrik Reinfeldt as the Moderate leader.

Among the four other Riksdag parties, the Christian Democrats and the Left Party both lost ground, whereas the Centre and Green parties managed to reach the parliamentary threshold of four percentage points.

Among minor parties, the Norrbotten Party reached 9.4% of the vote in its county, polling above 20% in some inland areas, although this was not enough to gain a Riksdag seat. The Sweden Democrats became the eight largest party for the first time, making sizeable gains and winning more council seats than ever before.

Results

Seat distribution

By municipality

References

Further reading
 

General elections in Sweden
Sweden
General
Sweden